Jacob D. Robida (June13, 1987 – February5, 2006) was an American neo-Nazi and murderer. Robida attacked three patrons at a gay bar in New Bedford, Massachusetts on February2, 2006 before fleeing by vehicle to Charleston, West Virginia, where he picked up passenger Jennifer Rena Bailey and drove southwest. He was stopped for a traffic violation by Gassville, Arkansas police officer James W. Sell, whom Robida shot and killed before fleeing east. Robida lost control of his vehicle in Norfork, Arkansas shortly after running over a spike strip laid by police. He then engaged in a firefight with police, during which he fatally shot Bailey and then shot himself in the head.

Robida died in a hospital in Springfield, Missouri at 03:38 CST on February5, 2006.

Attack

The 18-year-old, dressed in black, proceeded to order a drink allegedly using a fake ID indicating he was 23. After downing his first drink, he asked the bartender if the lounge was a gay bar. The bartender confirmed it was. After a second drink Robida then swung a hatchet at a patron's head, injuring him. Other patrons tackled him and relieved him of the weapon, whereupon Robida produced a handgun and began shooting, wounding at least three more people. Police treated the incident as a hate crime, and Robida was sought by police for three counts of attempted murder.

Robida fled the scene in a green 1999 Pontiac Grand Am to Charleston, West Virginia, where he was joined by Jennifer Rena Bailey and drove southwest. It has been reported that Robida lived with Bailey in West Virginia in 2004.  It is unclear whether Bailey joined him willingly or if she was abducted.

Manhunt and capture
Police immediately began a manhunt for Robida and raided his mother's home in New Bedford. She told them she had last seen him at 1:00a.m. bleeding from the head and that he had left soon after. They found weapons of all types, including hatchets, knives, handguns and a shotgun. In his bedroom they found "Nazi regalia" and anti-Semitic writings on the walls. Fearing he may have left Massachusetts, state police contacted the FBI, sparking a nationwide manhunt. Before long, flyers depicting Robida were distributed all over Massachusetts.

After talking with Sell for about half a minute, Robida opened fire with a 9mm handgun, killing the officer. He turned onto Arkansas Highway 201 headed south and continued to Arkana, Arkansas, where he fired at Arkansas State Police Sgt. Van Nowlin. Police pursued him and laid spike strips; although these flattened his front tires, they failed to stop the car. Robida fled for about 18miles down Arkansas Highway 5, where he turned south and drove into the small town of Norfork. In the middle of town he lost control of the car due to the front tires, spun out, and hit two parked vehicles. He then exchanged gunfire with police. During the gunfight, he shot Bailey in the head at point blank range with a Ruger 9mm semi-automatic pistol, killing her instantly. After Bailey's death, Robida shot himself in the right side of the head. He was flown more than 100miles to Springfield, Missouri for medical treatment, where he died of his injuries the next day, on February5.

Responses to the attack 
At first the mayor of New Bedford, Scott Lang, attributed the attack in part to video games:

This was a hate crime... the actions of a single deranged individual act as a wake up call to our community and once again the nation... This cycle of violence must stop. The guns have to come off the streets. The violent video games have to be taken out of our homes.

Believing the mayor was jumping to conclusions, gamers and members of GamePolitics wrote to Lang, citing that nobody had even mentioned video games as connection to the mass murders, nor had Robida ever mentioned games on his MySpace weblog. In reply to Andrew Eisen, a member of GamePolitics.com who had written to the mayor over his comments, Lang wrote:

When you get a chance please explain to me the social benefits behind police and military video games for the future of our children.While I am not familiar with these videos I have seen enough to know they can provide no healthy education for our children.  Lastly, there is no doubt in my mind that Mr. Robida played these video games on a regular basis as he was completely obsessed with weapons, violence and destruction.  See his my space website for more details.  I sincerely appreciate your comments.

However, examination of Robida's MySpace website (archived on GamePolitics ) showed a passion for Neo-Nazism and Insane Clown Posse, known for its violent and dark lyrics. One song in particular mentions attacking people with a hatchet, similar to Robida's crime.

On February7, Insane Clown Posse released a statement on the Robida attacks. The group's manager Alex Abbiss extended members Violent J and Shaggy 2 Dope's condolences and prayers to the families of the victims, stating "It's quite obvious that this guy had no clue what being a Juggalo is all about. If anyone knows anything at all about ICP, then you know that they have never, ever been down or will be down with any racist or bigotry bullshit."

Comments from Jack Thompson
On February7, 2006, Jack Thompson, a disbarred attorney, commented on the incident, describing the bar attack as a "killing scenario" from Postal² and the killing of Sell a "suicide by cop homicide" inspired by Grand Theft Auto. Police later dismissed the "suicide by cop" theory when it was discovered that Robida had fatally shot himself.

Thompson claimed to have spoken to a New Bedford detective, who "repeatedly" said Robida's friends had said "he played the Grand Theft Auto games." No further details have emerged, but the following day the Bristol County District Attorney rejected the video game link after examining all the evidence collected from Robida's apartment and car.
My look at the search warrant [for Robida's home] was that the investigators turned up no video games. From the information we have here, there is no proof video games were involved.

See also
 Violence against LGBT people

References

1987 births
2006 suicides
American bloggers
American neo-Nazis
American spree killers
Crimes in Massachusetts
Criminals from Massachusetts
Discrimination against LGBT people in the United States
Hate crimes
Murder in Massachusetts
Suicides by firearm in Arkansas
Violence against gay men in the United States
Violence against LGBT people in the United States
Violence against men in North America
Violence against women in the United States